George William Werley (September 8, 1938 – November 21, 2013) was a right-handed Major League Baseball pitcher who played in one game for the Baltimore Orioles in 1956 at the age of 18. Prior to playing professionally, he attended St. Louis University.

Werley appeared in his only big league game on September 29, 1956 against the Washington Senators, having been signed by the Orioles just a few weeks prior on September 2. He came into the game in the bottom of the eighth inning, replacing relief pitcher Bill Wight. In quick succession he retired the first two batters, Herb Plews and Ed Fitz Gerald. He then began to struggle, walking the next two batters – Pete Runnels and Roy Sievers – and allowing a single to Jim Lemon, which drove Runnels home from second. The next batter he faced was Hall of Famer Harmon Killebrew – who grounded out.

Though Werley spent only one game in the major leagues, he spent three seasons in the minors, going a combined 24–22 in 88 games. In 1958 with the Dublin Orioles, he went 16–10 with a 4.28 ERA.

Werley died on November 21, 2013 at age 75 in St. Louis, Missouri. He is survived by two children and eight grandchildren.

References

1938 births
2013 deaths
Aberdeen Pheasants players
Baltimore Orioles players
Baseball players from Missouri
Baseball players from St. Louis
Dublin Orioles players
Major League Baseball pitchers
Pensacola Dons players
Stockton Ports players